Allen Gabriel McDill (born August 23, 1971) is a former left-handed specialist in Major League Baseball who pitched from 1997 through 2001 for the Kansas City Royals (1997–98), Detroit Tigers (2000) and Boston Red Sox (2001).

McDill attended Arkansas Tech University. In 1991, he played collegiate summer baseball with the Wareham Gatemen of the Cape Cod Baseball League.

In a four-season major league career, McDill posted a 7.79 ERA in 38 appearances, including 11 games finished, 28 strikeouts, 18 walks, 38 hits allowed, and 34⅔ innings of work, without gaining a decision or save.

From 1992 to 2002, McDill also pitched for the Mets (1992–95), Royals (1995–97), Rangers (1999, 2002), Tigers (2000), Cardinals (2000), Red Sox (2001) and Orioles (2002) minor league systems. In 392 appearances, he posted a 46–46 record with a 3.75 ERA and 42 saves.

Milestone
While pitching for the 1995 Melbourne Monarchs of the Australian Baseball League threw a seven-inning no-hitter against the Gold Coast Cougars.

See also
Boston Red Sox all-time roster

References

External links
Baseball Reference
BR minor leagues
Retrosheet

Boston Red Sox players
Detroit Tigers players
Kansas City Royals players
Major League Baseball pitchers
Arkansas Tech Wonder Boys baseball players
Wareham Gatemen players
Baseball players from Mississippi
1971 births
Living people
American expatriate baseball players in Australia
Binghamton Mets players
Capital City Bombers players
Gulf Coast Mets players
Kingsport Mets players
Memphis Redbirds players
Oklahoma RedHawks players
Omaha Royals players
Pawtucket Red Sox players
Pittsfield Mets players
Rochester Red Wings players
St. Lucie Mets players
Toledo Mud Hens players
Tulsa Drillers players
Wichita Wranglers players